

See also
List of museums in India

References

Museums in Kerala
Kerala
Museums
Museums